Hampstead is a town in Rockingham County, New Hampshire, United States. The population was 8,998 at the 2020 census. Hampstead, which includes the village of East Hampstead, is home to a portion of the Rockingham Recreational Trail.

History 

Once part of Haverhill and Amesbury, Massachusetts, and settled in 1640, this town was formed as a result of the 1739 decision fixing the boundary line between Massachusetts and New Hampshire. It was originally known as "Timberlane Parish" because of the heavy growth of native trees. The town was incorporated in 1749 by colonial governor Benning Wentworth, who renamed it after Hampstead, England, the residence of William Pitt, a close friend.

The Hampstead Meetinghouse, constructed circa 1749–1768, was added to the National Register of Historic Places in 1980.

Hampstead was the home of the first honey factory in the United States, in 1816.

Geography 
Island Pond is in the southwest, with Wash Pond near the center and Angle Pond on the northern border. Hampstead lies mostly within the Merrimack River watershed, though the area east of Butman Hill and north of Smith Mountain is part the Piscataqua River (Coastal) watershed. Hampstead is home to Camp Tel Noar, an overnight summer camp on Wash Pond (Sunset Lake).

Adjacent municipalities
 Sandown, New Hampshire (north)
 Danville, New Hampshire (northeast)
 Kingston, New Hampshire (east)
 Plaistow, New Hampshire (southeast)
 Atkinson, New Hampshire (south)
 Derry, New Hampshire (west)

Demographics 

At the 2000 census there were 8,297 people, 3,044 households, and 2,279 families living in the town. The population density was 623.0 people per square mile (240.5/km).  There were 3,276 housing units at an average density of 246.0 per square mile (95.0/km).  The racial makeup of the town was 98.47% White, 0.23% African American, 0.08% Native American, 0.54% Asian, 0.05% Pacific Islander, 0.16% from other races, and 0.47% from two or more races. Hispanic or Latino of any race were 0.78%.

Of the 3,044 households 41.1% had children under the age of 18 living with them, 66.2% were married couples living together, 6.0% had a female householder with no husband present, and 25.1% were non-families. 20.7% of households were one person and 6.1% were one person aged 65 or older.  The average household size was 2.72 and the average family size was 3.19.

The age distribution was 28.9% under the age of 18, 5.1% from 18 to 24, 31.0% from 25 to 44, 25.6% from 45 to 64, and 9.3% 65 or older.  The median age was 38 years. For every 100 females, there were 98.4 males.  For every 100 females age 18 and over, there were 95.7 males.

The median household income was $68,533 and the median family income  was $79,114. Males had a median income of $56,625 versus $31,449 for females. The per capita income for the town was $29,195.  About 2.4% of families and 3.8% of the population were below the poverty line, including 6.3% of those under age 18 and 3.7% of those age 65 or over.

Transportation 
Three New Hampshire state routes cross Hampstead:

NH 111 crosses the town from the southwest to the northeast corner. It connects to Atkinson in the southwest and Danville in the northeast.
NH 121 crosses the western part of town from north to south; it is known locally as Main Street and Stage Road. It connects to Chester in the north via the southwest corner of Sandown and to Atkinson in the south.
NH 121A crosses the northeastern corner of town through the village of East Hampstead, connecting Danville in the north and Plaistow in the south. It is known locally as Sandown Road and East Main Street.

The nearest airport is Manchester–Boston Regional Airport along the border of Londonderry and Manchester.

Education
Local public schools include:
Hampstead Central School
Hampstead Middle School

The Town of Hampstead pays tuition for town students to attend Pinkerton Academy in Derry, and therefore Pinkerton serves as Hampstead's public high school.

Hampstead Academy is a private school in Hampstead.

Notable people
 Andy Seuss (born 1987), NASCAR professional driver

References

External links 
 
 Hampstead Historical Society
 Hampstead Public Library
 Tri-Town Times, community news
 New Hampshire Economic and Labor Market Information Bureau Profile
 Hampstead (N.H.: Town) Records at Dartmouth College Library

 
Towns in Rockingham County, New Hampshire
Populated places established in 1760
Towns in New Hampshire